Inokuchi Station is the name of two train stations in Japan:

 Inokuchi Station (Hiroshima)
 Inokuchi Station (Ishikawa)